Bruce Charles Arians (born October 3, 1952) is an American football executive and former coach in the National Football League (NFL). Since 2022, he has been a senior football consultant for the Tampa Bay Buccaneers. Arians was previously the head coach of the Arizona Cardinals from 2013 to 2017 and the Buccaneers from 2019 to 2021. He was also the interim head coach of the Indianapolis Colts during the 2012 season. Arians is known for his slogan "No risk-it, no biscuit," which encourages aggressive playcalling.

An offensive assistant for most of his career, Arians held his first NFL head coaching position with the Colts when head coach Chuck Pagano was treated for leukemia. As Indianapolis' interim head coach for 12 weeks, he guided a team that went 2–14 the previous season to a 9–3 record, earning them a playoff berth. Arians was named AP NFL Coach of the Year for the season and was the first interim head coach to receive the honor. His success in Indianapolis led to him becoming the Cardinals' head coach for five seasons, where he led them to two postseason runs, one division title, and an NFC Championship Game appearance in 2015. He also received a second Coach of the Year award after the 2014 season.

After initially retiring in 2017, Arians returned in 2019 to coach the Buccaneers. He led the team to their first playoff appearance since 2007 and first playoff win since 2002 during the 2020 season, culminating with a Super Bowl victory in Super Bowl LV. At age 68, he was the oldest head coach to win a Super Bowl. Arians retired from coaching a second time after the 2021 season and became a consultant with Tampa Bay.

Early life
A native of Paterson, New Jersey, Arians graduated from William Penn Senior High School in York, Pennsylvania. He previously attended York Catholic High School, where he was a standout scholastic quarterback.

Playing career
Arians attended and played college football at Virginia Tech.  As a senior in 1974, Arians was the starting quarterback in a wishbone offense for the Hokies football team.  That season, he completed 53 of 118 passes (44.9% completion pct.) for 952 yards with three passing touchdowns and seven interceptions.  He rushed for 243 yards and eleven touchdowns. Arians held the Virginia Tech school record for most QB rushing touchdowns in a season with 11. The record has since been broken by Jerod Evans, in 2016. He was also the first white player to share a dorm room with a black player in VT history. His roommate was James Barber, father of Ronde and Tiki Barber.

College coaching career
Arians began his coaching career in 1975 as a graduate assistant at Virginia Tech.  Arians then held an assistant coaching position at Mississippi State University (running backs and wide receivers) from 1978 to 1980 before heading to the University of Alabama to coach the running backs from 1981 to 1982 under Paul "Bear" Bryant.

Arians was also the head coach at Temple University from 1983 to 1988.  While head coach for the Owls, he compiled a 27–39 overall record over six seasons. He had only one winning record on the field, in 1986 when the Owls finished 6–5. However, all of those wins were later forfeited after it emerged that running back Paul Palmer, who was the runner-up in the Heisman Trophy voting in 1986, had signed with a sports agent before the season.  Besides Palmer, other standout players Arians coached at Temple included cornerback Kevin Ross, safety Todd Bowles, offensive guard John Rienstra, and running back Todd McNair. Ross, Bowles, and McNair would all later serve as NFL assistant coaches with or under Arians.

After coaching at Temple, Arians held positions with Mississippi State (offensive coordinator, 1993–95) and Alabama (offensive coordinator, 1997) in between NFL assistant coaching jobs.

NFL coaching career
At the end of the college football season in 1988, Arians was hired in the NFL as a running backs coach for the Kansas City Chiefs.  It was during this time with the Chiefs that he worked with the coach who brought him to the Pittsburgh Steelers, Bill Cowher.  He also spent one season as the tight ends coach of the New Orleans Saints in 1996.

Following this stint was when he made a name for himself when he got the job as the quarterbacks coach of the Indianapolis Colts in 1998.  He was the first quarterback coach of Peyton Manning when he arrived in the NFL.  Afterward, he was hired as offensive coordinator (2001–2003) for the Cleveland Browns under Butch Davis.  In 2002, he helped the Browns finish 9–7 (2nd in the newly aligned AFC North) and to a wild card playoff berth where they lost to the Steelers (36–33) in the first round.  It was during his tenure with the Browns that he first worked with Chuck Pagano who served as the Browns secondary coach from 2001 to 2004.

Coaching philosophy
Arians' coaching philosophy can be summed up with one phrase: "No risk it, no biscuit. You can't live scared." His former quarterback in Arizona, Carson Palmer, says, "You play for him, you see he just has guts. He will let it rip, let it fly no matter what." 
He first developed this philosophy when the old-timers at the bar he worked at in college told him, "In life you must take risks." During games he will always give the quarterback at least two options based on how the defense lines up. "One option will give us a chance to make a first down and the other option will give us a chance to score a touchdown." All his quarterbacks must believe, "If I have the right match up and the opportunity is there to take a shot at the deep ball, take it. I don't care if it's a third-and-three; if our best receiver is in single coverage and he's running a deep post route, throw him the goddamn ball."

One thing Arians cannot stand is when coaches play not to lose. He considers conservative coaching to be a cardinal sin. In his book, he writes, "That's not my way, brother. I'll never be too afraid to throw it and take the heat if it's incomplete. My job as an offensive coach is not to allow our defense to retake the field. Run out the clock and kneel down—that's my job."

Arians has an image of what the perfect NFL QB looks like. In his book he wrote "It's something you cannot see. He must have a big lion's heart, a heart that beats for an entire franchise." Arians says the heart is exhibited when a quarterback plays through pain, when he smashes into a 320-pound defensive linemen on third down to gain six extra inches for the first down. Or when he throws a pick and runs forty yards down field to make a tackle. What he calls "grit" is a must-have ability to make the dozens of decisions that need to be made in the twenty-five seconds the quarterback walks on the line of scrimmage and scans the defense to when the play is over.

On the practice field Arians is known to spend most of the time with his quarterbacks reviewing what transpires during the three to four seconds of a basic pass play. He believes the first thing the quarterback has to understand is his protection, because the defense can always blitz one more guy than your linemen can block. Because of this the quarterback has to look and read what will be coming from the opposing defense.

A primary reason Arians is known as a quarterback whisperer is the special relationship he has had with all of his quarterbacks as well as the production he has gotten out of them. "My quarterbacks have to be a member of my family, and that has nothing to do with football," he says. "Trust is everything. We have to connect on a deep level in order to really be able to build something together. Trust brings a higher level of communication and a higher level of commitment and accountability. We have to care for one another. It's all about family, family, family." While being a caring coach, Arians is also known to be a hard coach on his quarterbacks. When Peyton Manning had a bad game the first time he faced the Patriots his rookie year—he threw three interceptions midway through the fourth quarter of the game—he was so frustrated he begged Arians, who at the time was the team's quarterback coach, to be pulled. Arians responded by saying "F--k no. Get back in there. We'll go no-huddle, and maybe you'll learn something." While Arians has this hard style of coaching, his former quarterbacks have always had the utmost respect for him and attribute him as a big factor in their success.

Arians is known to socialize with players more than most NFL coaches. After Cardinals home games he was known to pull his car up. The trunk would be open and he would be handing out drinks to his players. He writes "If a player had a bad game, I'm going to give him a beer and big sincere hug. If a player had a great game, I'm going to give him a beer and a big sincere hug."

Pittsburgh Steelers
After the 2003 season, Arians was hired as the Steelers wide receivers coach, helping the Steelers in winning Super Bowl XL. In 2007 he was promoted to offensive coordinator, and would go on to win Super Bowl XLIII.

Despite his success in Pittsburgh, he had his fair share of critics. He was a gambling man who liked to take big risks that didn't sit well with fans. For instance, on a 3rd & 1, instead of running the ball or making a short quick pass, he wanted to air it out downfield. According to Arians, "I got booed in the Super Bowl parade. I look over and I hear 'get a fullback', and I say 'never'." In Arians' offense the quarterback is often exposed: Ben Roethlisberger took a high number of sacks every year and it left the Steelers front office unhappy. This led the front office to not renew Arians' contract as offensive coordinator when it expired after the 2011 season.

Indianapolis Colts
On January 28, 2012, Arians agreed to become the offensive coordinator of the Indianapolis Colts, replacing Clyde Christensen. Arians previously served as the quarterbacks' coach for the Colts from 1998 to 2000, coaching a young Peyton Manning, whom Arians was briefly reunited with until Manning's release 2 months later. On October 1, 2012, Arians was named the interim head coach of the Colts following coach Chuck Pagano's leukemia diagnosis.  Arians led the Colts to a 9–3 record, part of one of the biggest one-season turnarounds in NFL history. The nine wins are the most by an interim head coach in NFL history. After winning only two games in 2011, the Colts returned to the playoffs. Pagano returned to the Colts as head coach on December 24, 2012, with Arians returning to his role as offensive coordinator. Arians missed the Colts' Wild Card Round loss against the Baltimore Ravens due to being hospitalized with an illness, which was described by doctors as an inner ear infection or a virus; Arians had missed practice on January 3 due to the flu. Arians was named the 2012 AP Coach of the Year, making him the first interim head coach to win the award.

Arizona Cardinals
On January 17, 2013, the Arizona Cardinals and Arians agreed on a 4-year deal that would make Arians their 40th head coach.

2013 season
In the 2013 NFL Draft, Arians took a chance on troubled LSU defensive back Tyrann Mathieu, who had been kicked off the LSU football team as well as arrested for drug possession prior to the draft. Arians was the first Cardinals head coach since Norm Barry in 1925 to record at least nine wins in his first season, with a record of 10–6 in 2013.

2014 season
The Cardinals finished the 2014 season with an 11–5 record and were the #5 seed in the NFC. The 11 wins tied a Cardinals franchise record for most wins in a season. Arians led the Cardinals to a 9–1 start, best in the NFL, but injuries to starting quarterback Carson Palmer (who was 6–0 as the starter) and backup Drew Stanton, (who was 5–3 as starter) led to the Seattle Seahawks claiming the divisional title with a 12–4 record. Roughly half the team was put on injured reserve between Week 8 and Week 17. The injury plagued Cardinals were eliminated by the Carolina Panthers in the Wild Card Round, 27–16. Following the season, Arians was named AP Head Coach of the Year for the second time in three seasons.

2015 season
On February 23, 2015, the Cardinals announced a new four-year deal with Arians which would keep him with the Cardinals through the 2018 season. After starting 3–0 for a second consecutive season, Arians led the Cardinals to a 13–3 record, setting a new franchise record for regular season wins. The Cardinals defeated the Green Bay Packers 26–20 in overtime in the Divisional Round, Arians' first playoff win as a head coach. It was also only the third home playoff game in franchise history.

The next Sunday, in the NFC Championship, the Cardinals were defeated again by the Carolina Panthers, this time in a 49–15 blowout.

2016 season

In the 2016 season, Arians led the Cardinals to a record of 7–8–1.

2017 season
After the 2017 season, where he led the Cardinals to an 8–8 record, Arians announced his retirement from coaching after five seasons with the Cardinals, despite having a year left in his contract. Arians' final game with the Cardinals was on New Year's Eve of 2017, a 26–24 win over the Seattle Seahawks. That same day, he recorded his 50th and final win with the Cardinals and surpassed Ken Whisenhunt as the franchise's winningest head coach. Arians finished his tenure in Arizona with a 50-32-1 record.

Tampa Bay Buccaneers
On January 8, 2019, Arians agreed to terms on a four-year contract to come out of retirement and became the 12th head coach of the Tampa Bay Buccaneers.

2019 season
Arians stated in the offseason for the Buccaneers that he could win now with the team he had. He also put his faith in Jameis Winston, saying "I think with (quarterbacks coach) Clyde Christensen and (offensive coordinator) Byron Leftwich, he's in great hands."

Arians assembled the largest coaching staff in the NFL for the 2019 NFL season, at a total of 28 assistants. Arians made it known one of his intentions was fixing the defensive secondary. In the 2019 season the Buccaneers surrendered a league worst passer rating (110.9), yards per attempt (8.2) and completion percentage (72.5). In his first season with the team, Arians led the Buccaneers to a 7–9 record, finishing third in the NFC South.

2020 season
In Arians's second season with the team, the Buccaneers signed longtime New England Patriots quarterback Tom Brady to a two-year contract on March 20, 2020. They traded for Brady's former teammate and former Patriots tight end Rob Gronkowski on April 21, 2020, and he came out of retirement to play for the Buccaneers with Brady. In 2020, Arians led the Buccaneers to a 11–5 record, earning a Wild Card spot - their first playoff berth since 2007. After winning three straight road games against the Washington Football Team, New Orleans Saints, and Green Bay Packers, the Buccaneers reached their second Super Bowl appearance in Super Bowl LV. The playoff victories were the Buccaneers' first since the 2002 season when they won Super Bowl XXXVII, and Arians is the first head coach to lead an NFL team to play and win a Super Bowl in their home stadium when they defeated the Kansas City Chiefs 31–9 in Super Bowl LV.

2021 season
In Arians's third season with the team, the Buccaneers finished with a 13–4 record. They defeated the Philadelphia Eagles in the Wild Card round, but lost to the eventual Super Bowl LVI champion Los Angeles Rams in the divisional round in what would be Arians' final game as an NFL head coach. Arians finished his tenure in Tampa Bay with a 31–18 record and a 5–1 record in the postseason.

2022 season
On March 30, 2022, Arians informed staff that he would be stepping down from the head coach position and would take on a new role for the team as a Senior Football Consultant. He was succeeded by Bucs defensive coordinator Todd Bowles.

Broadcasting career
On May 3, 2018, Arians joined CBS Sports as a game analyst for the NFL on CBS, working with Greg Gumbel and Trent Green.

Personal life

Arians and his wife Christine run a charity called The Arians Family Foundation, which supports and develops programs to prevent and remedy the abuse and neglect of children. The Arians Family Foundation supports the Court Appointed Special Advocates (CASA) program.

A lifelong advocate for racial inclusion and against discrimination, Arians commented on the murder of George Floyd and the ensuing protests: "It's very disheartening [...] personally, you would hope that we would not be in 2020 still dealing with these issues. You would hope as a nation to have grown since 1968. I think we have, but not enough, obviously."

Arians is a prostate cancer survivor. He and his wife Christine have a son, Jake (born January 26, 1978), who spent part of the 2001 season as the placekicker for the Buffalo Bills, and a daughter, Kristi Anne (born December 15, 1980). Arians and his wife currently maintain residences in Tampa, Florida, and on Lake Oconee in Greensboro, Georgia.

In 2017, Arians released a book, The Quarterback Whisperer: How to Build an Elite NFL Quarterback.

Head coaching record

College

* 1986 team was 6–5 on the field, but had to vacate their wins due to the presence of an ineligible player on their roster.

NFL

* as interim coach, league awarded all W-L to Chuck Pagano. Record is not reflected in career totals.

References

External links
 Tampa Bay Buccaneers bio
 Arizona Cardinals bio

1952 births
Living people
Sportspeople from York, Pennsylvania
Players of American football from Paterson, New Jersey
Players of American football from Pennsylvania
American football quarterbacks
Virginia Tech Hokies football players
Coaches of American football from Pennsylvania
Coaches of American football from New Jersey
Virginia Tech Hokies football coaches
Mississippi State Bulldogs football coaches
Alabama Crimson Tide football coaches
Temple Owls football coaches
Kansas City Chiefs coaches
New Orleans Saints coaches
Indianapolis Colts coaches
National Football League offensive coordinators
Cleveland Browns coaches
Pittsburgh Steelers coaches
Indianapolis Colts head coaches
Arizona Cardinals head coaches
Tampa Bay Buccaneers head coaches
National Football League announcers
Super Bowl-winning head coaches